Shangsi County is a county in the southwest of Guangxi, China. It is the northernmost county-level division of Fangchenggang City.

Climate

References

Counties of Guangxi
Fangchenggang